Mael Sechlainn Ó Domhnalláin (died 1375) was an Irish poet.

Ó Domhnalláin was a member of the Ó Domhnalláin bardic family of Ui Maine (now south-west 

It is unknown if any examples of his work survive.

References

See also

 Domnallan mac Maelbrigdi
 Nehemiah Donnellan, Archbishop of Tuam, died 1609.
 Ainglioch Ó Dónalláin, poet, fl. mid-14th or mid-15th century.
 Sir James Donnellan, fl. 1607–1665.
 Nehemiah Donnellan, lawyer.
 Captain John Donnellan, fl. 1777–1781.
 Michael Donnellan (1900–1964), Clann na Talmhan politician.

14th-century Irish writers
Medieval Irish poets
People from County Galway
1375 deaths
14th-century Irish poets
Year of birth unknown
Irish male poets